James "Jimmy" O'Bryan Jr. (born June 7, 1956 in Saint Thomas, U.S. Virgin Islands) is a United States Virgin Islander politician, spokesman and former press secretary. He previously served as the Administrator of the island of Saint Thomas, U.S. Virgin Islands.

O'Bryan was a Democratic Party candidate for Governor of the United States Virgin Islands in the 2010 gubernatorial election. His running mate for Lt. Governor was Pamela Richards Samuel.

Biography

Early life
O'Bryan is a native of Saint Thomas, where he was born on June 7, 1956, to James A. O’Bryan Sr. and Elsa D. Oliver O’Bryan. He graduated from Charlotte Amalie High School in Charlotte Amalie in 1974 and was president of his class. O'Bryan went on to receive a bachelor's degree in mass communications and political science from Boston University in 1978.

Political career
O'Bryan previously served as a Senator in the Legislature of the Virgin Islands's 16th Legislature (1985–1986) for one term in office. He also served as the chairman of the Democratic Party of the Virgin Islands for two terms.

He was appointed as the press secretary for former Governor Alexander A. Farrelly.

O'Bryan was extremely active during the administration of former Governor Charles Turnbull. O'Bryan headed the Turnbull administration's Office of Public Relations, serving as Turnbull's spokesperson during his first term. He also chaired a Turnbull-created task force which worked to remove abandoned vehicles and other garbage from Saint Thomas. In April 2003, the Turnbull administration appointed O'Bryan as head of the committee charged with rebuilding the Sanderilla Thomas Bungalow at Rothschild Francis "Market" Square on the island of Saint Thomas.

He also served as the president of Virgin Islanders for Responsive Government.

On April 29, 2003, Governor Charles Turnbull appointed O'Bryan as the Administrator of St. Thomas and Water Island. O'Bryan succeeded Louis Hill as administrator. Hill resigned in January 2003 to take office as a Senator in the Legislature. O'Bryan was working as the assistant to the governor for public affairs and policy initiatives at the time of his appointment as Administrator of Saint Thomas and Water Island.

In 2010, O'Bryan left his morning slot on WDHP (1620 AM), a local radio station, to pursue a gubernatorial campaign.

2010 candidacy for governor
O'Bryan announced his candidacy for Governor of the United States Virgin Islands as a member of the  Democratic Party in the 2010 gubernatorial election. His running mate for Lt. Governor is Pamela Richards Samuel, the former U.S.V.I. Commissioner of Tourism. O'Bryan and Richards Samuel announced the launch of their campaign in an hour-long presentation on the WDHP radio station on August 17, 2010. He listed the top issues of their campaign platform as public safety, education, health care and employment.

O'Bryan faced incumbent Governor John de Jongh, Senator Adlah Donastorg and former Lt. Governor Gerard Luz James for the Democratic nomination in the primary election on September 11, 2010.

O'Bryan and Richards Samuel lost the Democratic gubernatorial primary election in 2010, placing fourth behind De Jongh, Donastorg and James. O'Bryan received 432 votes in the election, equalling approximately 3% of the total vote. O'Bryan told supporters and the media following the election, "The people have spoken, I respect their wishes, and I will go forward with this episode from now on." He would not say if he would endorse Governor John de Jongh, the winner of the primary, for a second term, explaining, "I’m going to listen to the rain tonight and think on it."

References

External links
James O'Bryan/Richards Samuel 2010 official campaign

1956 births
Living people
Senators of the Legislature of the United States Virgin Islands
Boston University alumni
People from Saint Thomas, U.S. Virgin Islands
Democratic Party of the Virgin Islands politicians
Boston University College of Communication alumni